Pokcha is the name of several rural localities in Russia:
, a selo in Troitsko-Pechorsky District of the Komi Republic
Pokcha, Perm Krai, a selo in Cherdynsky District of Perm Krai